Lara Escudero (born 6 June 1993) is a French ice hockey player and member of the French national team, currently playing with KMH Budapest of the European Women's Hockey League (EWHL).

She represented France at the 2019 IIHF Women's World Championship.

References

External links

1993 births
Living people
French women's ice hockey forwards
Sportspeople from Valenciennes
TPS Naiset players
HC Lugano players
French expatriate ice hockey people
Expatriate ice hockey players in Canada
French expatriate sportspeople in Canada
Expatriate ice hockey players in Finland
French expatriate sportspeople in Finland
French expatriate sportspeople in Hungary
French expatriate sportspeople in Switzerland
KMH Budapest (women) players
Swiss Women's League players